Floyd Marvin Stromme (August 1, 1916 – February 7, 1993), nicknamed "Rock", was a Major League Baseball pitcher who played in five games for the Cleveland Indians in its 1939 season, going 0–1 with a 4.85 ERA 13 innings pitcher.

External links

1916 births
1993 deaths
Major League Baseball pitchers
Northwestern Wildcats baseball players
Cleveland Indians players
Baseball players from North Dakota
People from Griggs County, North Dakota